Espinillo may refer to:
 Prosopis affinis or Espinillo, a species of flowering tree
 Espinillo, Chile, a village in Pichilemu, Chile
 Escuela Espinillo, a school in Cardenal Caro
 El Espinillo, Chaco, a settlement in Chaco Province, Argentina
 El Espinillo, Formosa, capital of the Pilagás Department, in Formosa Province, Argentina